Kolinovce is a village and municipality in the Spišská Nová Ves District in the Košice Region of central-eastern Slovakia.

History
In historical records the village was first mentioned in 1312.

Geography
The village lies at an altitude of 389 metres and covers an area of 4.677 km².
In 2011 has a population of 573 inhabitants.

Genealogical resources

The records for genealogical research are available at the state archive "Statny Archiv in Levoca, Slovakia"

 Roman Catholic church records (births/marriages/deaths): 1636-1896 (parish B)

See also
 List of municipalities and towns in Slovakia

External links
http://en.e-obce.sk/obec/kolinovce/kolinovce.html
https://web.archive.org/web/20080111223415/http://www.statistics.sk/mosmis/eng/run.html
http://www.kolinovce.sk
Surnames of living people in Kolinovce

Villages and municipalities in Spišská Nová Ves District